The WACO Air Museum is an aviation museum located in Troy, Ohio focused on the history of the Waco Aircraft Company.

History 
In 1997, WACO Field opened and a historic barn was raised on the property. A second building was completed in 2009.

The museum received two airplanes, two land vehicles and other objects on loan from the Ohio Historical Society in 2009. 

A theater made from a replica CG-4A glider was completed in 2015.

The museum broke ground on a new Learning Center in September 2017.

The museum acquired the prototype RPT in 2018.

Facilities 
The museum is located on Waco Field Airport , which features a  grass runway.

Collection 

 Waco 4 – replica
 Waco 9
 Waco ATO
 Waco Cootie – replica
 Waco GXE
 Waco RPT
 Waco UMF
 Waco YKS-6
 Waco YMF-5C

References

External links 
 

Aerospace museums in Ohio
Museums in Miami County, Ohio